Lloyd Herring (3 April 1871 – 5 August 1922) was an Australian cricketer. He played for Western Australia between 1898 and 1899.

References

External links

1871 births
1922 deaths
Australian cricketers
People from Clunes, Victoria
Western Australia cricketers
Cricketers from Victoria (Australia)